USS LST-37 was an  of the United States Navy built during World War II. She was transferred to the Royal Hellenic Navy on 18 August 1943, before being commissioned into the USN.

Construction 
LST-37 was laid down on 1 April 1943, at Pittsburgh, Pennsylvania by the Dravo Corporation; launched on 5 July 1943; sponsored by Mrs. Jack Domb; and transferred to the Hellenic Navy on 18 August 1943.

Service history 
LST-37 sailed from Galveston Bar for Key West, Florida, on 28 August 1943, with convoy HK 125, arriving in Key West, 1 September 1943.

On 11 October 1943, LST-37 left Halifax, Nova Scotia, in convoy SC 144, en route she joined convoy WN 497 that had departed Loch Ewe, on 26 October. She arrived in Methil, Scotland, on 28 October with a load of lumber.

Records do not indicate when LST-37 departed Methil, but she most likely sailed on 3 December 1943, in convoy EN 314 (series 2), arriving in Loch Ewe, on 5 December, with her sister ships USS LST-33, and USS LST-36, because she departed Liverpool, England, in convoy OS 61/KMS 35, on 8 December 1943. The convoy split on 20 December 1943, with LST-37 continuing on in convoy KMS 35G, arriving in Gibraltar, on 21 December. She sailed for on in convoy KMS 35, the next day, for Bizerta, Tunisia. It is here that she ran aground on 1 June 1944, and sank.

References

Bibliography

External links
 

 

1943 ships
Ships built in Pittsburgh
LST-1-class tank landing ships of the Hellenic Navy
World War II amphibious warfare vessels of Greece
Ships built by Dravo Corporation